William or Bill Daley may refer to:
Bill Daley (American football) (1919–2015), American football player
Bill Daley (baseball) (1868–1922), American baseball player
William Daley (Australian politician) (1870–1944), New South Wales politician
William Daley (ceramist) (1925–2022), American ceramist and professor
William M. Daley (born 1948), American politician from Illinois, former White House Chief of Staff
William R. Daley (1892–1971), American baseball executive
Billy Silverman (William Daley, born 1962), American wrestling referee

See also
William Daly (disambiguation)
William Daily (disambiguation)
William Dailey (disambiguation)